Sakaldiha Assembly constituency is one of the 403 constituencies of the Uttar Pradesh Legislative Assembly, India. It is a part of the Chandauli district and one of the four assembly constituencies in the Chandauli Lok Sabha constituency. First election in this assembly constituency was held in 2008 after constituency came into existence when "Delimitation of Parliamentary and Assembly Constituencies Order, 2008" was passed in the year 2008.

Wards and areas
Extent of Sakaldiha Assembly constituency is 1-Chahania North, 2-Chahania South, 3-Sakaldiha, PCs
72- Amaval, 74-Paura, 75-Pithapur, 79-Dharahara, 80-Ranepur &
95- Salempur of 4-Dhanapur KC of 1-Sakaldiha Tehsil.

Election results

2022

See also

Chandauli Lok Sabha constituency

References

External links
 

Chandauli district
Constituencies established in 2008
Assembly constituencies of Uttar Pradesh
2008 establishments in Uttar Pradesh